François "Noël" Bas (25 December 1877 –3 July 1960) was a French gymnast who competed in the early 20th century. He participated in Gymnastics at the 1900 Summer Olympics in Paris and won the silver medal in the only gymnastic event to take place at the games, the combined exercises. Gustave Sandras won gold.

References

External links

1877 births
1960 deaths
French male artistic gymnasts
Olympic silver medalists for France
Olympic gymnasts of France
Gymnasts at the 1900 Summer Olympics
Sportspeople from Lot (department)
Olympic medalists in gymnastics
Medalists at the 1900 Summer Olympics
20th-century French people